The 1959 Bowling Green Falcons football team was an American football team that represented Bowling Green State University in the Mid-American Conference (MAC) during the 1959 NCAA University Division football season. In their fifth season under head coach Doyt Perry, the Falcons compiled a perfect 9–0 record (6–0 against MAC opponents), won the MAC championship, and outscored opponents by a combined total of 274 to 83. The team was voted by the United Press International Board of Coaches as the 1959 national small college champion.  The team was inducted as a group into the Bowling Green Hall of Fame in 2013.

The team's statistical leaders were Bob Colburn with 788 passing yards, Chuck Comer with 361 rushing yards, and Bernie Casey with 264 receiving yards. Colburn and tackle Bob Zimpfer were selected by the UPI as first-team All-Ohio players. Colburn received the team's Most Valuable Player award. Jack Harbaugh, who later gained fame as a football coach, set a school record with three interceptions in the November 14 game against No. 1 Delaware.

Schedule

See also
 NCAA Division II Football Championship

References

Bowling Green
Bowling Green Falcons football seasons
NCAA Small College Football Champions
Mid-American Conference football champion seasons
College football undefeated seasons
Bowling Green Falcons football